The 2018 Leinster Senior Cup was the 117th staging of the Leinster Football Association's primary competition. It included all Leinster based League of Ireland clubs from the First Division and Premier Division, as well as a selection of intermediate level sides. The competition was won by Shelbourne

Third round

Fourth round
The 12 Leinster teams from the League of Ireland join the competition in this round.

Quarter-finals

Semi-finals

Final

References

2018
2018 in Republic of Ireland association football cups